Women's tennis is one of the most popular sports for women. It is one of the few sports in which women command fame and popularity that equal those of their male counterparts. Women's Tennis Association is the main organisation which runs female tennis. Founded by Billie Jean King in 1973 on the principle of equal opportunity, the WTA is the global leader in women’s professional sports. The WTA is one of the world’s most recognizable and high-profile sports organizations, consisting of more than 1650 players representing approximately 85 nations, all competing to earn WTA rankings points and prestigious tournament titles. The Women's Tennis Association is the principal organizing body of women's professional tennis. It governs the WTA Tour which is the worldwide professional tennis tour for women and was founded to create a better future for women's tennis.

History
Tennis has a long and winding history, and while today it's a sport of grand stadiums, flashy sponsors, sleek equipment and televised matches, it didn't always look that way. Lawn tennis got going in the mid-19th century after a British major and a Spanish merchant combined aspects of the British game rackets and the Spanish game pelota. The two opened the first tennis club in 1874. Wimbledon began in 1877 as a fundraiser — not exactly the most auspicious beginning for what would become one of the biggest tournaments in tennis. The first Ladies' Championship at the tournament was held in 1884. Not only has tennis been popular with women in the United States since its introduction — tennis was actually introduced to the United States by a woman, namely Mary Ewing Outerbridge. She was introduced to the game in Bermuda and brought it back with her to her home country. The first ever game played in America was between Mary Ewing Outerbridge and her sister Laura on Staten Island in 1874. Tennis became an Olympic sport in 1896, but the first women's tournament wasn't held until the next summer at the Olympic Games in 1900. Tennis continued to grow in popularity among both men and women in the early 20th century. New tournaments were organized, including the rest of what would become the four Grand Slams. Emerged in the 1930s, women were wearing something that looks a lot more like modern tennis clothes. In 1968, tennis's Open Era began, which opened the Grand Slam tournaments up to both professionals and amateurs. It was a major change for the sport, and it brought new opportunities for women. However women's tennis did not really become established until the 1960s, and especially with the establishment of the Women's Tennis Association in the 1970s. After years of women advocating for equal prize money, in 2007 Wimbledon became the last Grand Slam to equalize their prize money. Today, women in tennis have the opportunity to earn just as much as men, and no one has to wear corsets.

Features of Women's Tennis
In women's tennis matches the ball is usually played without effect (less than lift) and games tend to play more from the baseline; typing is generally less powerful than men.  The service is also less powerful; it is relatively less important than for men. However, there has been a noted evolution in this field since the 1990s, women's tennis is improving and is growing more and more popular.

Controversy 
Women's tennis has been marked by several cases, including cases of sexual abuse by trainers. The world of women's tennis is sometimes described as "homophobic" and "sexist". Over the years, women have been openly sexualized for outfits worn during matches. One of the biggest cases in women's tennis was regarding pro player, Serena Williams, in 2018. Serena Williams lost to Naomi Osaka in the 2018 women’s final — but post-match headlines ended up centering around controversy instead of Osaka’s big win. Williams was handed a $17,000 fine for three code violations, including coaching, breaking her racket and the “verbal abuse” of chair umpire Carlos Ramos. In May 2018, for example, she also received criticism for wearing a so-called “catsuit” bodysuit to the French Open. She said the suit was designed to prevent blood clots since she had given birth a few months earlier. Williams continues to deny that there was a clear coaching violation or that she ever lost control of her emotions, Van Natta said. In a press conference following the match, she said, “The fact that I have to go through this is just an example for the next person that has emotions and that wants to express themselves...they want to be a strong woman and they are going to be allowed to do that because of today.”

Bibliography
Le tennis féminin français, Vincent Cognet, Romain Lefebvre, Philippe Maria, Ed. du stade, 1999
Les dessous du tennis féminin, Nathalie Tauziat, ed. J'ai lu, 2001
N'oublie pas de gagner: Dans les coulisses du tennis féminin, Dominique Bonnot, ed. Stock, 20157
Women's Tennis Tactics, Rob Antoun, Human Kinetics, 2007

References

 
tennis
History of tennis